The Party for the Promotion of the Toiling Masses-Abanyamwete (PML-Abanyamwete) is a small political party in Burundi.

Political parties in Burundi